Barford is a village and civil parish in the Warwick district of Warwickshire, England, about three miles south of Warwick. As at the 2001 census the parish had a population of 1,171, that increased to 1,336 at the 2011 census. The Joint parish council also runs the villages of Sherbourne and Wasperton. In March 2014 "The Sunday Times" listed the village as one of the Top 10 places to live in The Midlands. In the village there are two pubs, a hotel with swimming pool, and a village shop owned and run by the community. 

The Church of England primary school that is in the village is called "Barford St. Peters". The University of Warwick Boat Club trains on the River Avon at Barford. Barford is served by Stagecoach bus routes X18 and 18A which link it with Coventry, Leamington Spa, Warwick and Stratford Upon Avon. The M40 motorway is just 1.5 miles from the village, with Warwick and Warwick Parkway railway stations just over 4 miles away.

History
Barford is mentioned in the Domesday Book as a fair-sized settlement situated in the hundred of Tremlowe and in Warwickshire.

St Peter's Parish Church dates back to the 14th century although largely rebuilt in 1844 by Richard Charles Hussey, sponsored by Louisa Ryland. 

Westham House on Westham Lane is now cut off from the rest of the village by the A429 bypass. It was originally a 16th century farmhouse, before being rebuilt in the 18th century as a gentleman's hunting lodge. In World War II, the house was used by Seaford Ladies College. It is now converted into apartments.

Barford House is a fine Grade II* listed Regency house, located on the main Wellesbourne Road through the village. Evelyn Waugh was a frequent visitor in the 1920s and 1930s.

Notable people
 Joseph Arch (1826–1919), first president of the National Agricultural Labourers Union and Liberal MP. One of the two pubs in Barford is named after him.
 Annie Butler (4 June 1897 – 28 September 2009), English supercentenarian, who, at the age of 112, was the second-oldest person in the United Kingdom until her death in 2009.
 John Fairfax (24 October 1804 – 16 June 1877), English-born journalist, is notable for the incorporation of the major newspapers of modern-day Australia.
 William Ivens (1878 – 1957), a religious and political figure in Manitoba.
 Wenman Wykeham-Musgrave (1899–1989), a Royal Navy officer who survived being torpedoed on three different ships on the same day in the action of 22 September 1914.

In Fiction
In C. P. Snow's novel The New Men the story's main location is a fictional early British nuclear experimental establishment based in Barford where the characters try to get an early nuclear pile going and also try to harvest enough enriched uranium or plutonium to try and beat the Americans to the bomb. As Snow’s science researchers, and science civil servant, characters are, or were, portrayed as Cambridge dons in this book (and the previous book in the series - The Masters) he clearly did want to make the location of the research station the real United Kingdom nuclear Centre at Harwell with its close association with Oxford. 

So instead, as this line from the novel puts it,: “For a site, they picked on a place called Barford –which I had not heard of, but found to be a village in Warwickshire, a few miles from Stratford-upon-Avon”. Several commentators claim, or suggest, that not only is the research station fictional but so is the village Barford. However clearly Snow was thinking of the real Barford which is indeed not far from Stratford-upon-Avon. If the “final” version of the research station as described in the last chapter of the book was real its size would certainly have more than dominated the real village of Barford.

References

External links

Barford community website
Barford cricket club

 
Villages in Warwickshire
Civil parishes in Warwickshire
Warwick District